The 24th British Academy Film Awards, given by the British Academy of Film and Television Arts in 1971, honoured the best films of 1970. The awards were held at the Royal Albert Hall, London and held on 4 March 1971. For the first time, the Society bestowed a Fellowship on someone who had left a permanent influence on the world of the big or small screen.  The very first BAFTA Fellowship Award was bestowed on Alfred Hitchcock Fellowship Award at this award event from Princess Anne.

Winners and nominees

Statistics

See also
 43rd Academy Awards
 23rd Directors Guild of America Awards
 28th Golden Globe Awards
 23rd Writers Guild of America Awards

References

Film024
British Academy Film Awards
British Academy Film Awards
British Academy Film Awards
British Academy Film Awards
British Academy Film Awards